Echagere is a small village located in Karnataka state, Mandya district and block, Hodaghatta panchayat. Its11 km from the city of Mandya. Other neighbouring villages include Keelara, Hodaghatta, Bellundagere.

Villages in Mandya district